Arnold McCuller (born August 26, 1950) is an American vocalist, songwriter, and record producer, born and raised in Cleveland, Ohio. He was active as a solo artist and session musician, but is perhaps best known for his work as a touring back-up singer with artists such as James Taylor, Linda Ronstadt, Phil Collins, Beck, Bonnie Raitt, and Todd Rundgren. He toured for forty-five years with Taylor and is an audience favorite for his featured vocal parts on the songs "Shower the People", "I Will Follow", and "Is That the Way You Look". He has also toured extensively with Collins and is one of the main lead vocalists on the live version of "Easy Lover". In 2010 McCuller joined the Troubadour Reunion Tour supporting James Taylor and Carole King.

Film
McCuller has had numerous acting parts in films, particularly in movies centered on music, such as American Hot Wax (1978) and The Hollywood Knights (1980). He appeared in the film The Sum of All Fears singing "The Star-Spangled Banner". Although he did not appear onscreen in Duets, his vocals were blended with those of actor Andre Braugher to make a composite singing voice for the character "Reggie Kane"; in the film, Reggie Kane sang with Paul Giamatti on "Try a Little Tenderness" and performed an a cappella version of "Free Bird".

McCuller also performed the song "Nowhere to Run" for the 1979 film The Warriors, which appears on the film's soundtrack (A&M Records); and was one of the four singers in the "guitar duel sequence" in the 1986 film Crossroads, with Ry Cooder.

Discography

Solo albums
 A Part of Me That's You (1984) with David Benoit
 Exception to the Rule (1994)
 You Can't Go Back (1999)
 Exception to the Rule (2000) reissue (with fewer songs)
 Back to Front (2002)
 Live at the Baked Potato (2002)
 Circa 1990 (2003)
 Sabor (2009)
The Present (2010)
 Soon as I Get Paid (2011)
 Back @ The Baked Potato Live 2015 (2015)
 Witness (2017)

with James Taylor
Flag (1979)
Dad Loves His Work (1981)
That's Why I'm Here (1985) 
Never Die Young (1988)
New Moon Shine (1991)
(LIVE) (1993)
 Hourglass (1997)
October Road (2002)
At Christmas (2006)
Covers (2008)
Before This World (2015)
American Standard (2020)
With many years of touring from 1977-2022; with the exception of 1990 (Phillip Ballou filled in), 1994 (Dorian Holley filled in), 2012 (Jim Gilstrap filled in with the exception of solo on "Shower the People"), and some of 2019 (Dorian Holley filled in at first and then both performed at Las Vegas & Tanglewood).

with Phil Collins
 Serious Hits... Live! (1990)
 Dance into the Light (1996)

with Lyle Lovett
 Joshua Judges Ruth (1992)
 I Love Everybody (1994)
 The Road to Ensenada (1996)
 It's Not Big It's Large (2007)

Film and television soundtracks
 The Warriors (soundtrack) [Soundtrack to the Motion Picture] (1979)
 Duets (film) [Soundtrack to the Motion Picture] (2000)
 Hairspray [Soundtrack to the Motion Picture] (2007)
 Chiquititas, Vol. 2 (2013)

References

External links
 Official website
 Arnold McCuller's MySpace
 

1950 births
Living people
20th-century African-American male singers
American male film actors
Record producers from Ohio
Songwriters from Ohio
Musicians from Cleveland
American session musicians
African-American songwriters
21st-century African-American people
American male songwriters
Lyle Lovett and His Large Band members